Kenneth A. Gottlieb (born May 1963) in Hollywood, Florida.

Gottlieb previously served as a Representative in the House of Representatives of the U.S. state of Florida. He received his Bachelor's degree from the University of Florida, and his Juris Doctor from the University of Miami.
After many years of practicing law in private practice he was elected in 2010 as a county judge in Broward County Florida.

Personal

When attending the University of Florida, in September 1981 he pledged with Tau Epsilon Phi fraternity where he was elected president of his pledge class of about 52 members. He married and was elected Broward County judge. He has 2 sons.

References

External links
Official Website of Gottlieb

University of Florida alumni
Tau Epsilon Phi
1963 births
Democratic Party members of the Florida House of Representatives
Living people